"Annie, I'm Not Your Daddy" is a song written by August Darnell and first recorded by his band Kid Creole and the Coconuts. It was released in 1982 as the third and final single from their album Tropical Gangsters. It is Kid Creole and the Coconuts' highest charting single on the UK Singles Chart, reaching a peak of no. 2. It also reached no. 18 on the U.S. Club Play Chart.

In a 2011 interview, Darnell stated that the royalty income from this song alone would be enough for him to live on.

Track listing

Also released as a picture-disc.

Also released as a picture-disc.

Charts

Weekly charts

Year-end charts

A"I'm a Wonderful Thing, Baby", "I'm Corrupt" and "Annie, I'm Not Your Daddy" charted together on the Billboard Hot Dance Club Play chart.

References

1982 songs
1982 singles
Kid Creole and the Coconuts songs
Songs written by August Darnell